José del Carmen González Joly (born 5 May 1991) is a Panamanian footballer currently playing for Unión Comercio in Peru.

In May 2018 he was named in Panama’s preliminary 35 man  squad for the 2018 World Cup in Russia. However, he did not make the final 23.

References

External links

1991 births
Living people
Panamanian footballers
Sportspeople from Colón, Panama
Panamanian expatriate footballers
Expatriate footballers in Peru
C.D. Árabe Unido players
Unión Comercio footballers
Panama international footballers
2017 Copa Centroamericana players
Association football midfielders
Liga Panameña de Fútbol players